Juan Andrés Gelly y Obes was an Argentine general and politician. He was an advocate for the reform of the Constitution of Argentina in 1860, chief of staff of the Argentine Army during the Paraguayan War as well as a personal friend of Bartolomé Mitre.

Biography
He was a teenager even when his father, Juan Andrés Gelly had to go into exile in Montevideo and taking his son with him due to the support he had given to the dictatorship of General Juan Lavalle and his opposition to Juan Manuel de Rosas. He then joined the defense against the siege that that city suffered for eight years, reaching the rank of colonel and head of a regiment of Argentine exiles. For some time after, he was exiled in Brazil, where he managed an estancia. During his stay in Montevideo, he established a close friendship with Bartolomé Mitre but, unlike Mitre, returned to Buenos Aires in 1855.

In Buenos Aires, he joined the Argentine Army with the rank of colonel, was a provincial deputy, commander of the Port of Buenos Aires, commander of the Navy of the State of Buenos Aires, and interim Minister of War and Navy during the battles of Cepeda and Pavón.

At the end of 1861 he was one of the diplomats sent by Miter to convince Justo José de Urquiza not to prevent the overthrow of President Santiago Derqui. He was a provincial senator in 1862, and promoted to the rank of general.

During Mitre's presidency he was Minister of War and Navy, a position he held until the end of 1867 which simultaneously occurred with the first half of the Paraguayan War. He was appointed Chief of Staff of the Argentine Army campaigning in Paraguay, which was why he resigned from his post as minister and then participated in the Battle of Tuyú Cué. President Domingo Sarmiento appointed him commander of the Argentine army in Paraguay, participating in the Pikysyry maneuver, although he resigned due to a strong altercation with the president shortly before the Sacking of Asunción.

He was the head of the national forces in Corrientes, where he fought General Nicanor Cáceres, who was trying to defend the constitutional governor from a revolution supported by President Mitre. He controlled part of the north of the Entre Ríos Province until the Battle of Don Cristóbal where he was defeated by López Jordán, although he had to withdraw at the end of the day due to the approach of more government forces. He was unable to prevent the rebel leader's march to Corrientes, where he would be decisively defeated.

Due to his Paraguayan ancestry, he was proposed as a candidate to become president there.

He was a national deputy between 1872 and 1874, for the Miter party, a position he resigned at the end of 1874 in order to participate in the  he also requested discharge from the Army. His participation in the revolution was secondary, although he was the chief of staff of the mitrista army defeated in the Battle of La Verde.

He was reinstated in the Army in 1877, by decree of President Nicolás Avellaneda, but was discharged again for his participation in the Revolution of 1880. He would only be reinstated at the end of the presidency of Julio Argentino Roca. Accompanying Mitre, he was part of the founding group of the Civic Union due to the Revolution of the Park.

During the presidency of José Evaristo Uriburu, he presided over the newly created Supreme War and Navy Council, which judged the conduct of officers of the Argentine Army and Navy.

His death, on September 18, 1904, was a national public event. His remains were deposited in the Recoleta Cemetery, and his tomb was declared a Historical Monument.

A town in the Santa Fe Province and a street in the Recoleta neighborhood of the city of Buenos Aires bear his name.

See also

Bartolomé Mitre
Paraguayan War

References

Bibliography
 

1815 births
1904 deaths
Military personnel from Buenos Aires
Politicians from Buenos Aires
Argentine people of French descent
Unitarianists (Argentina)
Civic Union (Argentina) politicians
National Civic Union (Argentina) politicians
Government ministers of Argentina
Argentine generals
Argentine military personnel of the Paraguayan War